Andreas Dahlström (born June 22, 1991) is a Swedish former professional ice hockey centre. He ended his career with hometown club, Flemingsbergs IK in the Swedish Division 2. He formerly played one game with AIK of the Elitserien in the 2011-12 season. He was selected by the Anaheim Ducks in the 6th round (161st overall) of the 2010 NHL Entry Draft.

References

External links

1991 births
Living people
AIK IF players
Almtuna IS players
Anaheim Ducks draft picks
Swedish ice hockey centres